The Kampala Southern Bypass Highway is a proposed four-lane, dual carriage highway in the Central Region of Uganda, connecting, Bweyogerere, in the Wakiso District, to Munyonyo in the Makindye Division of Kampala, the largest city and capital of Uganda.

Location
The road would start at Bweyogerere on the Kampala–Jinja Expressway, near Mandela National Stadium at Namboole. It would pass through Butabika, Luzira, and Kyeyitabya, to end at Munyonyo, where it would join the southern spur of the Entebbe–Kampala Expressway. The approximate coordinates of the highway at Bweyogerere would be 0°21'04.0"N, 32°39'45.0"E (Latitude:0.351117; Longitude:32.662496).

Background
As part of efforts to decongest Kampala, a southern bypass similar to the Kampala Northern Bypass Highway has been proposed. The road would form an arc through the city's southeastern suburbs. It would join the southern spur of the Entebbe–Kampala Expressway, which traverses the southeastern suburbs of the city, to form a semi-circle. The road would be a toll road and would be tendered, constructed, and owned by the consortium that will own, manage, and operate the Kampala–Jinja Expressway.

Timetable
Originally, the tender for this road together with that for the Kampala–Jinja Expressway were planned to be advertised in May 2015. Once construction starts, the combined  Kampala–Jinja Expressway & Kampala Southern Bypass Highway is projected to take 10 years to construct.

In September 2018, UNRA revealed that eight firms had bid to be considered in the construction of this highway and the connecting Kampala–Jinja Expressway. The consortia vying for the contract include (1) South Korean and Chinese firms, comprising the CCKS Consortium (2) Tecnasol Luisa Goncal from Portugal (3) Shapoorji Pacconji Group from India (4) A consortium of Chang Chyi Enterprise Company Limited (CCECL) & CRCCIG from China (5) Enkula Expressway Consortium from South Africa  (6) A consortium of Austria & Turkish firms, Strabag & IC Ictas (7) A consortium of French and Portuguese firms KJ Connect, Vinci Concessions & Mota-Engil and (8) China Communications Construction Company & China First Highway Engineering Company Limited.

Construction costs
It is estimated that the Kampala Southern Bypass Highway would cost approximately US$250 million (about UGX:664 billion) to build.

See also
 List of roads in Uganda

References

External links
 Uganda National Road Authority Homepage
  Ugandan Government Increases Road Network Funding
 Uganda: Work On Shs5 Trillion Jinja Expressway to Start in March 2016

Roads in Uganda
Wakiso District
Transport in Kampala